The Surrender at Világos, which was the formal end of the Hungarian Revolution of 1848, took place on 13 August 1849, at Világos, (now Șiria, Romania). The terms were signed by Hungarian General Artúr Görgey on the rebels' side and Count Theodor von Rüdiger of the Russian Imperial Army. Following the capitulation, General Julius Jacob von Haynau was appointed Imperial plenipotentiary in the country and brutally re-subjugated it.

Russian intervention in the revolution

After the Russians intervened in the conflict, it was only a matter of time before the Hungarians were defeated, as the Austro-Russians now had far greater military strength. The deciding point came at the Battle of Temesvár, which ended in a decisive Austrian victory,  after which the Hungarians' choices essentially amounted to surrender or annihilation. On 21 July, Cavalry Captain Katlaroff and Count Theodor von Rüdiger delivered an offer from Russian General Chruloff to Görgey, who was at Rimaszombat (now Rimavská Sobota, Slovakia); the offer included total freedom for Hungarian officers and men.

László Batthyány and another officer delivered Görgey's response to Chruloff, in which Görgey demanded that all Hungarians get freedom, not only those who had served in the conflict. He would also gladly accept if one of the Russian princes would wear the Holy Crown of Hungary (Holy Crown of Saint Stephen).

Surrender
The Hungarian Army surrendered to Russian General Rüdiger on 13 August 1849. At Bohus Castle, they signed the document of surrender. Görgey tried to show by the terms of the surrender that Hungary had been defeated by Russia, and not by Austria. This proved to be pointless as the Russians simply just handed them over to the Austrian authorities.

Aftermath
After the surrender and despite the Russian Emperor's pleas for clemency, the Austrians engaged in harsh reprisals against Hungary. They sentenced hundreds of soldiers and civilians to death, and imprisoned even more. Prisoners were conscripted into the Austrian Army.

On 6 October 1849, at Arad (today in Romania), the Austrians executed twelve Hungarian generals and one colonel, who are known as the 13 Martyrs of Arad. The same day, they executed Lajos Batthyány, the first Hungarian Prime Minister, by firing squad.

References

Hungarian Revolution of 1848